Nine Muses (often stylized as 9Muses) was a South Korean girl group formed by Star Empire Entertainment in 2010 with an admission and graduation concept. The group consists of total of fourteen former members: Jaekyung, Bini, Rana, Lee Sem, Sera, Eunji, Euaerin, Minha, Hyuna, Sungah, Gyeongree, Hyemi, Sojin, and Keumjo.

Following an unsuccessful debut with the single "No Playboy," the group's line-up changed with the release of the comeback single, "Figaro", which reached the Top 100 Billboard Charts. Then the group's single, "News", and its EP, Sweet Rendezvous, both earned a peak popularity position of six, and with additional new members the group came back with follow-up albums Wild, Dolls, Prima Donna and their digital single "Glue" which ranked at number four and nine.

After a year-long hiatus in 2014, the group came back with a new line-up on its 2015 album Drama that January. Later releases included 9Muses S/S Edition and Lost. The group disbanded in February 2019 following the contract expirations of three former members, Sojin, Hyemi and Keumjo.

History

2009: Formation and "Give Me" 
On April 8, 2009, Star Empire Entertainment announced its plan to create a girl group called Nine Muses on the Mnet reality show, "Children of the Empire". According to Star Empire CEO Shin Ju-hak, the group's line-up would rotate and its members would be active in fields including singing, acting and modeling. Through the show, Rana, Sera, Eunji, Lee Sem, Euarin, Jaekyung, Bini, Minha and Hyemi were chosen to be members of Nine Muses. They released their first song "Give Me," a duet with Seo In-young for the soundtrack to Prosector Princess, on April 7, 2010.

2010–2011: Debut, awards win and commercial popularity 

Nine Muses officially debuted on August 12, 2010 with the single album Let's Have a Party. Its lead single, "No Playboy", was written and produced by Rainstone and Park Jin-young. The album debuted at number 18 on the Gaon Album Chart, while "No Playboy" peaked at number 56 on the Gaon Digital Chart.

In October, Jaekyung left the group to concentrate on her modeling career and was replaced by Hyuna prior to promotions for the group's second single, "Ladies". In December, Nine Muses won a Top Ten Singers Award at the Korean Culture Entertainment Awards. Later that month, the group performed in Japan for the first time, alongside boyband ZE:A, at the Seoul Train: Nine Muses & Friends concert in Tokyo.

In February 2011, Star Empire announced that members Bini and Rana had left the group to focus on acting and modeling while Euaerin had left the group to focus on her studies. However, Euaerin ultimately re-joined the group, which released the digital single "Figaro" as a seven-piece group on August 18, 2011.

2012–2013: Sweet Rendezvous, nine-member comeback, Wild, and Prima Donna 

Following the addition of new member Gyeongree, the group released the single, "News," on January 11, 2012. The song was produced by Sweetune, who was also behind their "Figaro" single. On March 8, 2012, Nine Muses released their first extended play, Sweet Rendezvous, with the lead single "Ticket". The extended play debuted at number 6 on the Gaon Album Chart. The group featured in a documentary called 9 Muses of Star Empire released in 2012 that chronicling their debut period.

In January 2013, Star Empire announced the addition of new member Sungah, reporting that the group would soon be making a comeback with nine members for the first time since 2010. Nine Muses released their second single album, Dolls, with a lead single of the same name, on January 24, 2013. The single, which marked the group's fourth collaboration with producer team Sweetune, was the group's highest charting single to date, peaking at number 17 on the Gaon Digital Chart. The group followed up on that success with the release of their second extended play, Wild, including a title track of the same name, on May 9, 2013. The extended play debuted at number 4 on the Gaon Album Chart, while the single peaked at number 22 on the Gaon Digital Chart.

On October 13, 2013, Nine Muses released their first studio album Prima Donna with lead single "Gun". The group released digital single "Glue" and its music video on December 4, 2013.

2014–2015: Eight-member comeback, Drama, 9Muses S/S Edition and Lost 
In January 2014, it was announced that Lee Sem and Eunji had left the group following the expiration of their contracts. The agency released a statement saying that they would continue with the remaining seven members, with possible new members added. In June, it was revealed that Sera's contract was not renewed and she would be leaving the group to focus on solo activities and establish her own agency. While the company said the group would release new music in August after the addition of a new member, it instead debuted the project group Nasty Nasty on September 3. The group, which released the single "Knock," was composed of Gyeongree, ZE:A's Kevin and singer Sojin.

In January 2015, Star Empire announced the addition of Nasty Nasty member Sojin and new member Keumjo to Nine Muses. On January 23, 2015, the now-eight-member group released their third extended play Drama, including the lead single of the same name. The song peaked at number 13 on the Gaon Digital Chart.

In July 2015, the group released their fourth mini-album 9Muses S/S Edition with the title track "Hurt Locker". Nine Muses' fifth mini album Lost was released on November 24, 2015.

2016–2017: More line-up changes and Muses Diary series 

The group held their first concert Muse in the City on February 19, 2016 at Wapop Hall in Seoul Children's Grand Park and also held two fan meets in China. On June 7, 2016, it was confirmed that Minha and Euaerin would be leaving the group at the end of the first week in June after they both decided not to renew their contracts with the company; the agency later confirmed that those former members would continue on to do solo activities. Minha later became an actress and Euaerin went back to modeling and other projects. Nine Muses later formed a four-member subgroup, Nine Muses A (an abbreviation for Nine Muses Amuse), which was composed of Gyeongree, Hyemi, Sojin, and Keumjo for a summer comeback. On October 4, 2016, it was revealed that Hyuna wouldn't renew her contract at the end of month and she'd be withdrawing the group after six years. Nine Muses remained as a four-member group due to Sungah taking hiatus to pursue her work as a disk jockey.

The group released their sixth extended play Muses Diary Part. 2: Identity on June 19, 2017. It was the second release of the Muses Diary series from their debut album under Nine Muses A. It charted on Gaon Album Charts at number 5 and at number 15 on Billboard. The extended play contained six tracks, with the lead single being "Remember". Their comeback showcase was held at the YES24 Muv Hall on the same day as the album's release. Nine Muses held second concert Re:Mine on July 29, 2017 at the Bluesquare Samsung Card Hall located in Yongsan. On August 3, 2017, a repackaged version of Muses Diary Part. 2: Identity, titled Muses Diary Part. 3: Love City, was released. The reissue contained of four tracks from Muses Diary Part. 2: Identity and two new songs including the title track "Love City".

2018–2019: Disbandment and Remember 
On February 10, 2019, it was announced that the group had disbanded nine years after debuting due to the expiration of Sojin, Keumjo and Hyemi’s contracts and two of the members graduating. Prior to their disbandment, the group concluded activities with the release of their final digital single titled "Remember" on February 14 and held a fan meeting with the same title on February 24.

Public image and reception 
Prior to their debut, Nine Muses were marketed as a group of "model dolls" in reference to the members' tall and slim physiques, and the fact that several members had previously worked as models. The label was used to describe the group throughout their career. Nine Muses was best known for their "sexy" image, and was especially popular among military servicemen in South Korea, earning the group the nickname "military president".

While the group experienced modest success, they failed to achieve top-tier popularity. South Korean media dubbed Nine Muses a "nadallen" group, alongside peers Dal Shabet and Rainbow, for having "all of the conditions for success" but none of the luck of more popular groups.

Members

Former members
Jaekyung (재경) (2010)
Bini (비니) (2010 - 2011)
Rana (라나) (2010 - 2011)
Eunji (은지) (2010 - 2014)
Lee Sem (이심) (2010 - 2014)
Sera (세라) (2010 - 2014)
Euaerin (이유애린) (2010 - 2016)
Minha (민아) (2010 - 2016)
Hyemi (혜미) (2010 - 2019)
Hyuna (현아) (2010 - 2016)
Gyeongree (경리) (2012 - 2019)
Sungah (성아) (2012 - 2016)
Sojin (소진) (2015 - 2019)
Keumjo (금조) (2015 - 2019)

Timeline

Discography

Studio albums

Reissues

Extended plays

Single albums

Singles

Collaborations

Videography

Music videos

Concerts 
Headlining
 Muse in the City (Seoul, 2016)
 Re:Mine (Seoul, 2017)

Awards and nominations

See also
 Muses in popular culture

Notes

References

External links 

 Official Korean website 

K-pop music groups
Musical groups established in 2010
South Korean dance music groups
South Korean girl groups
2010 establishments in South Korea
Musical quintets